Lynsey Sharp (born 11 July 1990) is a Scottish track and field athlete who competes in the 800 metres. She is the 2012 European champion and represented Great Britain at the 2012 Olympic Games in London. She won a silver medal at the 2014 Commonwealth Games. Her personal best is 1:57.69, the seventh fastest time over 800m by a British woman, set in the final of the 2016 Olympic Games in Rio de Janeiro.

Personal life
Lynsey Sharp was born in Dumfries, Scotland and lived her early life in nearby Lochmaben. She is the daughter of former Scottish athletes Cameron Sharp and Carol Sharp (née Lightfoot). Her father won a 1982 European silver medal in the 200 m and competed at the 1980 Olympic Games, while her mother has an 800 m best of 2:02.91 and competed at the 1982 Commonwealth Games.

Sharp went to The Mary Erskine School in Edinburgh. She graduated with a 2:1 in Law (LLB) from Edinburgh Napier University in 2012 a few weeks before competing in the London Olympics. She has said she was inspired to study law after her father fought a medical negligence case following permanent injuries he sustained in a road crash.
She is also a fan of Scottish Premiership side Rangers.

Sharp lives with fellow Scottish athlete Andrew Butchart in San Diego, US. In October 2019, it was reported that the couple had become engaged.

Career
As a teenager, Sharp competed at the IAAF World Youth Championships and IAAF World Junior Championships. In 2011, she improved her 800 m personal best by almost four seconds. In June, she took her best down from 2:04.44, to 2:02.48 in Watford then 2:01:98 in Prague. Then in July, at the European U23 Championships in Ostrava, she further improved to 2:00.65, to win a bronze medal. This would be upgraded to silver due to the 2013 disqualification of Elena Arzhakova.

In June 2012, at the UK Championships & Olympic trials, Sharp was a surprise winner of the 800 metres. Olympic qualifying rules stated that a country could send three athletes in an event provided they had achieved the A standard, or one athlete who had the B standard. Sharp only had the B standard, while four other British women had the A standard: an injured Jenny Meadows and three athletes who Sharp had defeated at the Olympic trials. A week after the trials, Sharp won a silver medal at the European Championships in Helsinki with a personal best of 2:00.52, a time that was still outside the A standard. (This would be upgraded to gold the following year, after abnormalities were found in Elena Arzhakova's biological passport. Arzhakova was stripped of both her 2012 European title and 2011 European U23 title.) The selectors decided to select Sharp and leave behind athletes including Meadows and Marilyn Okoro. At the Olympics, she ran 2:01.41 in her heat to qualify for the semi-finals, where she finished seventh in 2:01.78, failing to reach the final.

At the end of the 2013 season, Sharp had surgery on her ankle as it had become infected. This resulted in her competing throughout the 2014 season against medical advice with an open wound in her foot. In July 2014, Sharp ran under two minutes in the 800 m for the first time, running 1:59.67 at the Diamond League meeting in Lausanne. In August, at the 2014 Commonwealth Games in Glasgow, she ran 2:01.34 to win a silver medal in the 800 m. The race was won by 2013 World champion Eunice Sum. The night before the Commonwealth 800 m final, Sharp suffered stomach cramps and sickness and had to be placed on a drip at the Poly-clinic at the Athletes' Village until 5:30 am on the morning of the race. Sharp's performance was hailed as "a miracle run". Two weeks after the Commonwealth Games, she won a silver medal at the European Championships in Zürich in a time of 1:58.80, breaking Susan Scott's Scottish record of 1:59.02 and moving to eighth on the UK all-time list. The race was won by Maryna Arzamasava of Belarus in 1:58.15.

2016 Olympics
Sharp finished sixth in the 800 metres final at the 2016 Rio Olympics, improving her own Scottish record to 1:57.69. Following the race, Sharp broke into tears and said that "it was difficult to compete against Caster Semenya and other hyperandrogenic athletes after the rule to suppress testosterone levels was overturned." Sharp was criticised in the media when she appeared to ignore Semenya post-race while embracing fellow runners Joanna Jóźwik and Melissa Bishop. Sharp has since defended her comments, saying on Twitter that:

 Sharp had previously claimed that "there were obvious athletes with heightened testosterone" and that there were "two separate races being run."

2017–present
Sharp ran 1:58.80 in the 800 metres at the Athletissima Lausanne Diamond League race in July 2017, then later in the month ran a season's best of 1:58.01 at the Herculis Monaco Diamond League. Three weeks later at the 2017 World Championships in London, she reached the 800 m final, finishing eighth in 1:58.98.

At the 2018 Commonwealth Games, Sharp was eliminated in the heats of the 800 m, running 2:01.63.

After competing throughout 2019, Sharp went on hiatus due to surgery to remove pre-cancerous cells followed by pregnancy, but stated that she intends to return to competition.

Achievements
 Scottish Athletics Athlete of the Year: 2011 and 2012.
 CG Scottish Athlete of the Year: 2014
British Champion (800 m): 2012, 2014, and 2015

All information taken from IAAF profile and power of 10 profile.

Circuit wins and titles 
  Diamond League
 2014: British Grand Prix
 2018: Memorial Van Damme
 2019: Anniversary Games

References

External links
 

1990 births
Living people
Sportspeople from Dumfries
Scottish female middle-distance runners
British female middle-distance runners
Olympic female middle-distance runners
Olympic athletes of Great Britain
Athletes (track and field) at the 2012 Summer Olympics
Athletes (track and field) at the 2016 Summer Olympics
Commonwealth Games silver medallists for Scotland
Commonwealth Games medallists in athletics
Athletes (track and field) at the 2014 Commonwealth Games
Athletes (track and field) at the 2018 Commonwealth Games
World Athletics Championships athletes for Great Britain
European Athletics Championships winners
European Athletics Championships medalists
British Athletics Championships winners
Alumni of Edinburgh Napier University
People educated at the Mary Erskine School
Medallists at the 2014 Commonwealth Games